Wau Rural LLG is a local-level government (LLG) of Morobe Province, Papua New Guinea.

Wards
01. Maus Bokis
02. Mrs Booth
03. Maus Kuranga
04. 4 Mile/Nami
05. Wara Muli (DAL Stn.)
06. Nemnem Station
07. Eddie Creek
08. Bitoi
09. Wandumi
10. Sandy Creek
11. Kwembu
12. Kaisenik
13. Biawen
14. Were Were
15. Winima
16. Elauru
17. Wisini
18. Kembaka
19. Tori
20. Tekadu

References

Local-level governments of Morobe Province